Pennsylvania Avenue is a street in Washington, D.C. and its suburbs on which some major landmarks, including the White House and the United States Capitol, are located.

Pennsylvania Avenue may also refer to:
Pennsylvania Avenue (Baltimore), a street in Baltimore, Maryland
Pennsylvania Avenue, a portion of Connecticut Route 161
Delaware Route 52 or Pennsylvania Avenue
Pennsylvania Avenue (Towson, Maryland), a street in Towson's central business district
Pennsylvania Avenue (Brooklyn), a major street in Brooklyn, New York
Pennsylvania Avenue, a property in Monopoly (game)
Pennsylvania Avenue (IRT New Lots Line), a New York City Subway station in Brooklyn
Pennsylvania Avenue (BMT Fulton Street Line), a former New York City elevated railway station in Brooklyn
West Virginia Route 105 or Pennsylvania Avenue
Penn Avenue in Pittsburgh, Pennsylvania

See also
1600 Pennsylvania Avenue, the address of the White House, also the name of a musical
2000 Pennsylvania Avenue, a shopping center in Washington, D.C.
Pennsylvania Avenue Bridge, a bridge across the Rock Creek, not to be confused with John Philip Sousa Bridge
Pennsylvania Avenue Line (Baltimore), a former streetcar route in Baltimore, Maryland
Pennsylvania Avenue Line (Washington), a Metrobus route in Washington, D.C.
Pennsylvania Avenue National Historic Site, a unit of the National Park Service